Andrey Nikiforovich Vitruk (7 July 1902 – 1 June 1946) was a Soviet military officer, a Major General of the Soviet Air Forces and a Hero of the Soviet Union.

Early life
Vitruk was born July 7, 1902, in Andrushki near Zhytomir, then in Russian Empire, to a Ukrainian peasant family. He graduated from a local school and became a worker in a sugar factory. Following the Russian Civil War, in 1924 he joined the Red Army and graduated from a school of artillery. In 1934 he received further training at the Borisoglebsk Military Aviation School. As a pilot of fighter-bombers he took part in the Khalkhyn-Gol battles against Japan and in the German and Soviet Invasion of Poland in 1939. Until 1940 he also served on the Finnish front during the Winter War.

Career
In 1941 he received officer's training in the Military Aviation Academy and became the commanding officer of the Soviet 65th Air Regiment of the Leningrad Military District. On that post he remained until the beginning of the German invasion of the Soviet Union. On July 6, 1941, although wounded in action, Vitruk remained on duty and was promoted to the rank of Lt. Colonel. He commanded his regiment during the transfer of equipment from the outdated Polikarpov I-15bis to the new Ilyushin Il-2. Following the transfer and training of the crews the regiment was divided and Vitruk continued to command one of its parts. In October 1941 it was transferred to the Western Front near Moscow. By early 1942 he accomplished his 21st sortie, without any successes. However, for his superb command of the regiment on February 24, 1942, he was awarded with the title of the Hero of the Soviet Union.

In July 1942 Vitruk became the commanding officer of the 291st Division, later transformed into the 10th Guards Division of the VVS. On that post he commanded his unit during the battles of Voronezh, Kiev, Târgul Frumos and the Iassy-Chisinau operation. Later on he took part in the battles leading to the Soviet capture of Ploiești, Bucharest and Craiova in Romania, as well as Belgrade in Yugoslavia and Székesfehérvár in Hungary. For his actions during the Yugoslavian campaign he was awarded with the title of the Hero of Yugoslavia.

Death
He died of a serious disease on June 1, 1946, and was buried in Kiev.

Awards
 Hero of the Soviet Union
 Order of Lenin
 Order of the Red Banner, four times
 Order of Suvorov, 2nd class
 Order of Kutuzov, 2nd class
 Order of Bogdan Khmelnitsky, 2nd class
 Order of Alexander Nevsky
 Order of the Red Star
 Order of the National Hero of Yugoslavia

Notes

External links
 Biography on War Heroes site 

1902 births
1946 deaths
People from Zhytomyr Oblast
People from Volhynian Governorate
Communist Party of the Soviet Union members
Soviet major generals
Soviet Air Force generals
People of the Soviet invasion of Poland
Soviet military personnel of the Winter War
Soviet World War II pilots
Ukrainian people of World War II
Ukrainian aviators
Heroes of the Soviet Union
Recipients of the Order of Lenin
Recipients of the Order of Suvorov, 2nd class
Recipients of the Order of Kutuzov, 2nd class
Recipients of the Order of Bogdan Khmelnitsky (Soviet Union), 2nd class
Recipients of the Order of Alexander Nevsky
Recipients of the Order of the People's Hero
Recipients of the Order of the Red Banner
Recipients of the Medal "For Courage" (Russia)